The  was a class of two armored cruisers of the Imperial Japanese Navy (IJN) based on the s developed by Italy at the end of the 19th century.

Background
The Italian Giuseppe Garibaldi-class design was a private venture by Gio. Ansaldo & C., which was hoping to profit from the need for the world's navies to modernize towards heavily armored steam warships. The design was so popular that between 1894 and 1902 ten cruisers were purchased by four different countries: The first five by the Italian Navy, four by the Argentine Navy and one by the Spanish Navy.

There is a disagreement in sources as to who originally ordered these ships. Conway's All the World's Fighting Ships states that they were ordered by the Italian Navy, while naval historian Robert Scheina writes that it was actually Argentina.

Design
Designed by Edoardo Masdea, the Garibaldi-class cruiser was a hybrid between a cruiser and a battleship. At  maximum speed, the design was slightly slower than contemporary cruisers, but was very heavily armed and also heavily armored, in a package with very low displacement and moderate dimensions.

The class was unusual in that they did not have a uniform main armament. Some had single  guns in gun turrets fore and aft; others (including the Kasuga) had a mixed armament of a single  gun in one turret and another turret with twin  guns. A third variation (including Nisshin) was a uniform armament of four  guns, twin gun turrets fore and aft.

Ships in class

Kasuga was originally to be named Mitre but was renamed as Rivadavia by Argentina.  She served in the Russo-Japanese War and took part in the Battle of the Yellow Sea and again at the Battle of Tsushima. After 1922, she was partially disarmed as part of the Washington Naval Treaty and used as a training ship. She was bombed and sunk by US Navy carrier aircraft at Yokosuka 18 July 1945, raised and scrapped in 1948.

Nisshin was originally to be named Roca but was renamed as Mariano Moreno by Argentina. She served in the Russo-Japanese War and was severely damaged during the Battle of the Yellow Sea and again at the Battle of Tsushima. After 1922, as part of the Washington Naval Treaty she was partially disarmed and used as a training ship. Nisshin was finally expended as a target and sunk in 1936.

Afterwards
The success of the Japanese Navy in using armored cruisers in the line of battle during the Russo-Japanese War of 1905 drew considerable attention from navies and ship designers worldwide. The armored cruiser design soon evolved into the dreadnought armored cruiser, which became known as the battlecruiser.

Notes

References
 
 
Gardiner, Robert (editor) (2001) Steam, Steel and Shellfire, The Steam Warship 1815–1905, 
 
 
 
Kofman, V.L. Armored Cruiser Type Garibaldi, Morskaya Kollektsia 3-1995

Further reading

External links

Cruiser classes